Alden is an unincorporated community in Newport Township in Luzerne County, Pennsylvania, United States. Alden is located at the intersection of Kirmar Avenue, Alden Mountain Road, and Robert Street, southwest of Nanticoke.

References

Unincorporated communities in Luzerne County, Pennsylvania
Unincorporated communities in Pennsylvania